Wang Lihong (born 3 February 1968) is a Chinese fencer. He competed in the individual and team foil events at the 1992 Summer Olympics.

References

1968 births
Living people
Chinese male fencers
Olympic fencers of China
Fencers at the 1992 Summer Olympics
Asian Games medalists in fencing
Fencers at the 1990 Asian Games
Fencers at the 1994 Asian Games
Asian Games gold medalists for China
Asian Games silver medalists for China
Medalists at the 1990 Asian Games
Medalists at the 1994 Asian Games